Cheryl Tall (born in New Jersey in 1946) is an American visual artist whose work is primarily in the medium of sculpture and large wall installations in addition to, mixed-media, oil and acrylic painting. Tall is most notable for her intricate sculptures and her works have been in prominent and private collections all over the world.  She has an MFA from the University of Miami and her present art studio is in Leucadia, CA.

Work
Tall's primary medium is clay, coil built into large figurative sculptures and larger wall installations. Her work focuses on the relationships between people and their surroundings while her subject matters often include architectural and figurative elements. Tall likes to use references from classical mythology to portray archetypal situations. Ripe goddess figures combined with tree forms and animal shapes, expressing her desire for the harmonious existence of human beings with each other and with nature. While many of these images are inspired by personal experiences, she feels that the viewer can find himself in them.

Tall's work has been described as,"Togetherness and apartness. As an expression of duality, many of her works portray two or more figures in close proximity, sometimes with two heads that seem to come from the same body. She effects co-joining as a visual means to explore the tensions and strengths inherent in close relationships."

Her work has been published in 20 books including; 500 Figures, 500 Animals, 500 Dolls, 500 Dolls II, 500 Vases, Confrontational Ceramics, Winged Manor, No More Starving Artists, Ceramics Today, American Art Collector, The ACGA Book, The Ceramic Design Book, Surface Design, Making Marks and Sole Purpose among others.

Tall has also been featured in magazines such as, Ceramic Monthly, Ceramics Art and Perception, Clay Times, Studio Potter, Pottery Making Illustrated, Sculptural Pursuit, and American Craft Magazine.

Her work can be seen in various museum collections both nationally and internationally and she has had exhibitions and residencies all over the world including, The Banff Centre for the Arts, Banff, Canada, the International Workshop of Ceramic Art, Tokoname, Japan; Greece, France, International Ceramic Studios, Kecskemét, Hungary; Ganjin Celadon Festival, Gangjin, Korea; Mexico, China, England, Watershed Center for Ceramic Arts, Newcastle, ME, and the United States.

Influence 
Tall's pieces tend to fuse storybook illustration with surrealism and medieval folk art. She deals with global issues by posing pop culture references against 12th century characters, portraying multiple figures in close proximity, while exploring the tensions and strengths inherent in today's society.

Influential artists for Tall include Robert Arneson, Shepard Fairey, Andy Goldsworthy, Viola Frey, Paul Klee, Giorgio de Chirico, Oskar Kokoschka and Giselbertus. She has also studied and been influenced by prominent clay artists such as Judy Moonelis, Christine Federighi, Paul Soldner, Patty Warishina, and Adrian Arleo.

Teaching 
Tall teaches two-day workshops at universities and museums all over the world. These workshops encompass her personal techniques in quick coil building and large scale sectional sculptures, glazing, and finishing. They are intended for intermediate to advanced students but she also takes time out to teach private classes for students of all levels in sculpting, clay and paint from her studio in Leucadia, CA.

Collections 
 The King-Size Ceramic Museum, Shanghai, China
 International Workshop of Ceramic Arts, Tokoname, Japan
 The Ceramic Research Center, University of Arizona, Tempe, Arizona
 Gangjin International Ceramic Museum, Gangjin, Korea
 Foosaner Art Museum, Melbourne, Florida
 Burroughs-Chapin Museum of Art, Myrtle Beach, South Carolina
 Florida Atlantic University, Boca Raton, Florida
 Penn State University, State College, Pennsylvania
 Palomar College, San Marcos, California

Awards and honors

2000's 
 Cheryl Tall: Cirque De Luna, Hyde Gallery, Grossmont College, San Diego, CA 2018
 Cheryl Tall, Tony Clennell and Ken Baskin, Alabama Power Gallery, Birmingham, AL 2017
 Cheryl Tall: The Playhouse, Lighthouse ArtCenter, Tesqueta, FL 2017
 Luminata, solo exhibition, Coastal Eddy Gallery, Laguna Beach, CA 2016
 National Clay and Glass Biennial, Brea Gallery, Brea, CA, featured artist 2015
 Cannon Invitational, Cannon Gallery, Carlsbad, CA, featured artist 2014
 Winged Manor, Vincent’s, Escondido, Ca, solo exhibition 2013-15
 Juror's Choice Award, San Diego Art Institute, San Diego, California, 2012
 California Regional Exhibition, for "Valley of the Malls" painting, 2012
 Juror's Choice Award, San Diego Art Institute, San Diego, California, 2011
 California Regional Exhibition, for "Hamilton House" painting, 2011
 Artist Residency, Banff Centre for the Arts, Banff, Alberta, Canada, 2011
 Artists Invite Artists, Watershed Center for Ceramic Art, Newcastle, Maine, 2009
 Invited Artist, Gangjin International Ceramics Exhibition, Gangjin, Korea, 2009
 International Ceramics Studio, Kecskemet, Hungary, 2008
 Banff Centre for the Arts, Alberta, Canada, 2007
 1st Place Award, Art Riot Exhibition, Escondido Municipal Gallery, Escondido, California, 2006
 First place, 2nd Annual Sculpture Competition, Sculptural Pursuit Magazine, Magazine Cover and Feature Article, 2005
 First place, Black and White, Escondido Arts Partnership, Escondido, California, 2002
 FPIP Grant, $5000, City of Escondido, Escondico, California, 2002
 Award of Merit, San Diego County Fair, Fine Arts Exhibition, Del Mar, California, 2002
 First place, Summation, Escondio Arts Partnership, Escondio, California, 2002
 Best of Show, 1st Pl. Ceramics, 2nd Pl. Sculpture, Del Mar, California, 2002
 First place Sculpture, Starry Nights, Del Mar Art Center, Del Mar, California, 2001
 Levy/Polycan Kiln God Resident, Watershed Center for Ceramic Arts, Newcastle, Maine, 2001
 Second place, Art Fest Juried Competition, Court House Cultural Center, Stuart, Florida, 2001

 Third place Sculpture, Artitude Exhibition, Backus Gallery, Ft. Pierce, Florida, 2001
 Second place, Art Fest Juried Competition, Court House Cultural Center, Stuart, Florida, 2000
 Juror's Award, Clay Show 2000, CORE: New Art Space, Denver, Colorado, 2000
 Artist Residency, Venasque, Provence, France, 2000

1990's 
 Best of Show, New Genres/New Millennium, Court House Cultural Center, Stuart, Florida, 1999
 Best of Show, All Florida Juried Competition, Boca Museum of Art, Boca Raton, Florida, 1999
 Best of Show, 46th Florida Craftsmen Exhibition, LeMoyne Art Foundation, Tallahassee Florida, 1999
 Best of Show, Art Fest Juried Competition, Court House Cultural Center, Stuart, Florida, 1999
 Best of Show, Artist Registry Exhibition, Court House Cultural Center, Stuart, Florida, 1998
 3rd Place, Art Fest Juried Competition, Court House Cultural Center, Stuart, Florida, 1998
 Resident Artist Grant, Vermont Studio Center, Johnson, Vermont, July 1998
 Award of Merit, 45th Florida Craftsmen Exhibit, Art & Culture Center, Hollywood, Florida, 1998
 2nd Place Award, Artist Registry Exhibition, Stuart, Florida, 1997
 Resident Artist Grant, Watershed Center for Ceramic Arts, Newcastle, Maine, 1997
 Resident Artist Grant, IWCAT Competition, Tokoname, Japan, 1996
 Exhibition Award, University of Miami, Lowe Art Museum, Coral Gables, Florida, 1994
 MFA Scholarship, University of Miami, Department of Art, Coral Gables, Florida, 1993

References

External links 
 
 The Archetypal Sculpture of Cheryl Tall, thefigurativeartbeat.com
 

Living people
People from Florida
People from Encinitas, California
20th-century American sculptors
1946 births
21st-century American sculptors
Sculptors from Florida
Sculptors from California
20th-century American women artists
21st-century American women artists
American women sculptors